al-Haluwaniyah is a village in northern Aleppo Governorate, northern Syria.

With 763 inhabitants, as per the 2004 census, al-Haluwaniyah administratively belongs to Nahiya Jarabulus within Jarabulus District. Nearby localities include al-Hajalieh  to the northeast, Haymar  to the southeast, and al-Bir Tahtani  to the southwest.

References

Populated places in Syria